The Kilmarnock War Memorial is a war memorial located in Kilmarnock  Scotland. Built in 1927, it pays tribute to all those who fought in the First World War, Second World War, Korean War & the Northern Ireland Conflict. The building is accessible to the public, although access is restricted to a degree.  The key is available from the Dick Institute, Elmbank Avenue, Kilmarnock KA1 3BU. Located across the road directly opposite the War Memorial.

Wall mounted inside are commemorative plaques to the following: First World War (1914-1918), Second World War (1939-1945), Second World War - civilians, Korean War (1950-1953), Northern Ireland Conflict; The Troubles (1969-1998) Source; 

Inside there is a figure cast in bronze, ‘The Victor’, whose head is bowed in silent contemplation of the cost of war.

Interior Description: Hall of Remembrance with ionic pillars at the entrance. Inside there is a marble floor, There are 6 Bronze Plaques for WW1 and 2 for WW2 with names, also Brass Plaques for Korean war and Northern Ireland Casualties, and a Bronze Figure of Victory. The 850 WW1 names originally have subsequently been added to. Source: 

Exterior Plaque: Exterior: TO THE MEMORY OF THOSE/ WHO GAVE THEIR LIVES IN THE GREAT WAR/ 1914 - 1918/ THEIR NAME LIVETH FOR EVERMORE Plaque: IN EVERLASTING MEMORY OF THE MEN & WOMEN/ OF KILMARNOCK WHO GAVE THEIR LIVES/ IN THE SERVICE OF THEIR COUNTRY/ IN THE TWO WORLD WARS Plaques, two to seven: (WW1 Names) Plaques, eight & nine: 1939 - 1945/ (Names) Plaque 10- IN MEMORY OF THOSE WHO GAVE THEIR LIVES/IN THE KOREAN WAR/[names] Plaque 11- IN MEMORY OF THOSE WHO GAVE THEIR LIVES/IN NORTHERN IRELAND/[name] Source@;

References 

Listing at IWM

World War I memorials in Scotland
World War II memorials in Scotland
Buildings and structures in Kilmarnock
Buildings and structures completed in 1927
Bronze sculptures in Scotland
Category B listed buildings in East Ayrshire
1927 in Scotland